Sufism is considered as an essential aspect of Islam in Afghanistan. Most people are followers of Sufism and Sufis have a considerable influence on both urban and rural society. Sufism has been part of the country for as long as 1300 years, so Afghanistan is recognised as the "Home of Sufi Saints". Mullah Omar himself was a Naqshbandi Pir. And above the entrance to his abode was written “ Oh the one who enters recite Salawat upon the noble Prophet” peace be upon him.

Influence
Sufism is tightly bound to the history of Afghanistan, as Afghan kings were traditionally crowned in the presence of a great Sufi master. The Sufis were also involved in revolts against many political rulers. In 1919, under King Amanullah, the Sufis felt their position in society under threat. Many Sufi and non-Sufi Muslims united to overthrow King Amanullah.

Sufi rituals and practices 
Qawwali, a devotional Sufi music, is sung over the country. Other Sufi practices includes zikr, construction of various Khanqahs to spread Islam. The Naqshbandi tariqa or order is one of the most dominant Sufi orders in Afghanistan. The Mujaddidiya branch of the Naqshbandi tariqa is said to influential to the present day. Pir Saifur Rahman is one of the notable Sufi of this order. The other affiliates of the Naqshbandi order are Ansari, Dahbidi, Parsai, Juybari. The other Sufi orders followed in Afghanistan are Qadriyya and Chishti Order.

Milad-un-Nabi (SAW) is celebrated by Sufis in Afghanistan. The various belongings of Muhammad (Peace be upon Him) such as Moo e Mubarak (Muhammad's (Peace be upon Him) Hair), Khirka Sharif, are sacred things for Sufis in Afghanistan, and they have built shrines around the belongings.

Beliefs
People in Afghanistan regard Sufi shrines as places to unburden themselves, sharing their problems at the feet of Sufi saints, believing the saint can intercede on their behalf. It is a strong belief that prayer by a Sufi saint can eliminate poverty, cure illnesses, improve relations with loved ones and ease from various ills of life. When people become helpless after using all the possibilities in their hands then they refer to Sufi saints. Sufi saints are considered as the representatives of Allah who can build their relationship with Allah and all their desires - through the saint - can be directly heard and fulfilled by Allah.

Suppression of Sufi practices in Afghanistan
At the height of ISIS rise, in 2018 around 50 religious scholars were the victim of suicide bombing during the Mawlid celebration in Afghanistan.

Recognition

Former president of Afghanistan Sibghatullah Mojaddedi was a Sufi Sheikh.
 Sufis in Afghanistan are known for their miraculous powers. Pilgrimage to Sufi shrine (Ziyarat) is recognised in all of Afghanistan.

List of notable Afghani Sufis
Afghanistan is the birthplace of many Sufis, such as:

 Hakim Sanai (Ghazni)
 Hakim Jami (Herat)
 Sheikh Mohammad Rohani
 Khwaja Abdullah Ansari
 Sibghatullah Mojaddedi
 Ahmed Gailani
 Abobaker Mojadidi
 Mullah Omar
 Rumi

References

Sufism
Sufism in Afghanistan
Islam in Afghanistan